The 2021 Real Salt Lake season is the team's 17th year of existence, and their 17th consecutive season in Major League Soccer, the top division of the American soccer pyramid. RSL entered the 2021 season looking to rebound from a tumultuous 2020 season, having finished near the bottom of the table and endured the challenges of the COVID-19 pandemic. The pandemic continued to have a significant impact on MLS in 2021, causing the season's start to be delayed to mid-April instead of the traditional first weekend in March, a reworked schedule that focused heavily on intra-conference play to reduce travel, and stadiums at reduced capacity. The state of Utah allowed RSL to open the season with Rio Tinto Stadium at 50% capacity.  The 2021 Major League Soccer season began on April 16, 2021, though RSL did not begin their season until the following week, April 24, having had a bye in the opening weekend due to the odd number of teams in MLS in 2021.

RSL's offseason was marked by the retirements of several key players, including long time captain Kyle Beckerman. The club's ownership was also in question, as Dell Loy Hansen had agreed to sell the club following allegations of racism directed at club players and employees. The pending sale of the club resulted in a relatively quiet offseason on the signing front, with most of the clubs new signings coming from the club's own USL Championship team, Real Monarchs.

RSL entered the season with low expectations, with most pre-season projections predicting a near last place finish. Despite this, RSL opened the season with two straight wins, including a road win at Minnesota. They would go on to spend much of the spring and summer hovering at or just above the playoff line. In a surprising move, head coach Freddy Juarez departed the club on August 27 to take a position as an assistant coach to Brian Schmetzer in Seattle.  Assistant coach Pablo Mastroeni took over the head coaching position on an interim basis. Under Mastroeni's leadership, the club saw mixed form, rarely winning or losing consecutive matches. RSL qualified for the 2021 MLS Cup Playoffs on the last matchday of the season, or "Decision Day," following a 1-0 road win against Sporting Kansas City. All-star forward Damir Kreilach scored the go-ahead goal in the 90+5" minute of the game, essentially saving the club's season with the final kick of the regular season. The result ensured RSL the 7th and final spot in the  playoffs, subsequently eliminating the LA Galaxy, as RSL held the first points tiebreaker, total wins.

Competitions

Preseason

MLS regular season

April

June

July

August

September

October

November

Playoffs

Standings

Western Conference Table

Overall table

Results summary

U.S. Open Cup

Stats

Squad appearances and goals
Last updated December 10, 2021.

|-
! colspan="14" style="background:#A51E36; color:#DAAC27; text-align:center"|Goalkeepers

|-
! colspan="14" style="background:#A51E36; color:#DAAC27; text-align:center"|Defenders

|-
! colspan="14" style="background:#A51E36; color:#DAAC27; text-align:center"|Midfielders

|-
! colspan="14" style="background:#A51E36; color:#DAAC27; text-align:center"|Forwards

|-
|}

Assists and Shutouts
Stats from MLS Regular season, MLS playoffs, CONCACAF Champions league, and U.S. Open Cup are all included.
First tie-breaker for assists and shutouts is minutes played.

Club

Roster
 Age calculated as of December 4, 2021 (The club's final matchday of the season)
,

Transfers
''

In

MLS Drafts

Out

Notes

Loans

In

Out

Trialist

References

Real Salt Lake seasons
Real Salt Lake
Real Salt
Real Salt